Philly Mignon is an album by drummer Philly Joe Jones that was recorded in 1977 and released on the Galaxy label.

Reception

The AllMusic review by Scott Yanow stated "For this Galaxy LP drummer Philly Joe Jones leads a variety of all-stars ... Overall, everyone plays well on this modern hard bop set".

Track listing
 "Confirmation" (Charlie Parker) – 6:38
 "Neptunis" (Benny Bailey) – 2:23
 "Jim's Jewel" (Charles Bowen Jr.) – 5:10
 "Polka Dots and Moonbeams" (Jimmy Van Heusen, Johnny Burke) – 10:28
 "United Blues" (Ron Carter) – 5:41

Personnel
Philly Joe Jones – drums 
Nat Adderley – cornet (tracks 1, 3 & 5) 
Dexter Gordon – tenor saxophone (tracks  2 & 4) 
Ira Sullivan - tenor saxophone, soprano saxophone (tracks 1, 3 & 5) 
George Cables – piano (tracks 1, 2 & 4) 
Ron Carter – bass

References

Galaxy Records albums
Philly Joe Jones albums
1978 albums